Jonathan Yamil López (born 19 January 1989) is an Argentine football forward. He currently plays for All Boys of the Primera B Nacional in Argentine.

Career
López began playing professional football in 2006 with Primera B Nacional (Argentine second division) club Atlético de Rafaela. At the end of the 2008–09 season Rafaela qualified to the promotion playoff against Gimnasia y Esgrima La Plata. After a 3–3 draw and failure to gain promotion, López joined Primera División side Arsenal de Sarandí on a one-year loan. In 2010, he joined Peñarol in Uruguay, again on loan.
In 2011, López returned to Atlético de Rafaela to play in Primera B Nacional, helping the team obtain promotion. 
In 2012, López signed a loan for six months to play in Defensa y Justicia, due to the lack of participation in the current league.

Honours
Atlético de Rafaela
 Primera B Nacional (1): 2010–11

References

External links
 
 
 Argentine Primera statistics at Futbol XXI 

1989 births
Living people
Sportspeople from Entre Ríos Province
Argentine footballers
Association football forwards
Atlético de Rafaela footballers